Ara Vardanyan (born December 21, 1974 in Bambakashat, Armenia) is an Armenian weightlifter.

Vardanyan won a silver medal at the 1998 World Weightlifting Championships. He competed at the 1996 Summer Olympics, coming in 7th place.

Major results

References

External links 
 Ara Vardanyan at Lift Up

1974 births
Living people
Armenian male weightlifters
Olympic weightlifters of Armenia
Weightlifters at the 1996 Summer Olympics
European Weightlifting Championships medalists
World Weightlifting Championships medalists
20th-century Armenian people